HEG may refer to:

 Hans Christian Heg (1829–1863), Norwegian-American politician and soldier
 Helong language, spoken in Indonesia
 Hemoencephalography
 Herlong Recreational Airport, serving Jacksonville, Florida, United States
 Homing endonuclease genes
 Homogeneous electron gas
 Hydro-erosive grinding
 Hyperemesis gravidarum, a complication of pregnancy
 Mount Heg, in Antarctica
 Host Europe Group, a web hosting company in the UK